The first season of Greek Idol premiered on 5 March 2010 on Alpha TV.

Judges and host

Hosts
A number of Greek entertainers had been rumored as potential hosts of the show, haven't gone through screen tests. On January 19, 2010, Alpha TV announced that actress Ada Livitsanou will host the show. Livitsanou had previously appeared as a guest on the season finale of rival singing competition The X Factor (Greece) where she sang "Think".

However, it was revealed on April 20, 2010, that Roula Koromila would be the new host of the show as of the April 26 when the "live shows" began. Livitsanou was still present on the show, presenting backstage segments.

Judges
Shortly after announcing the show, Alpha TV started airing a new ad on December 22, 2009, announcing Nikos Karvelas as the head judge. On January 20, 2010, it was rumored that Karvelas will not be part of Greek Idol, and had left for unknown reasons.  On January 21, 2010, one day before auditions begin, Alpha TV confirmed that Karvelas has left the show, and thanked him for his work up until that point. Although Alpha TV and Karvelas did not state the reason for his departure, various news outlets reported that it was due to comments made by host Ada Livitsanou after being picked, downplaying the judges roles, and stating that the judges have little say in the competition, as well as other potential jury picks Karvelas did not agree with. On the same day, it was announced that singer Yiannis Kotsiras will be a judge on the show, but on January 23, 2010, Kotsiras revealed that he would not take part in the show and thanked Alpha for their enthusiasm with him.

On January 24, 2010, Alpha announced that the judges for the show would be songwriter Dimitris Kontopoulos, music teacher and author Maro Theodoraki, who is also the niece of composer Mikis Theodorakis, and video director Kostas Kapetanidis.

Petros Kostopoulos, media publisher and president of Imako Media S.A., served as a guest fourth guest judge to the show on April 27, 2010, with the premier of the first live shows. At the start of the second live show on May 3, 2010, it was announced that Kostopoulos would become the fourth permanent judge for the rest of the season.

Way to the Top 15

Auditions
Participants who wished to audition had to be between 16 and 32 years old. Auditions began in Thessaloniki and were held on 22, 23, and 24 January 2010 at the "Porto Palace" hotel. Auditions continued in Cyprus between 8 and 9 February 2010. The Athens auditions, were held on 12, 13, and 14 February 2010 at the "Royal Olympic Hotel" The final audition was held in Piraeus on 27 and 28 February at "Hotel Theoxenia".

Recall
The recall rounds consisted of three phases. In the first phase, the 150 contestants chosen from auditions were split up and had to sing their favorite song in front of judges, where 90 were eliminated. In the second phase, the remaining 60 contestants were split up into groups and assigned a song to sing as a group, with half were eventually eliminated. In the third and last phase, the remaining 30 contestants sang a song individually with the help of a piano, eventually being narrowed down to 15 contestants to take part in the live show.

Live shows

Top 15 – Contestant's Favorite
Each contestant had to sing their favorite song. The guest performer for this episode was Yannis Ploutarchos.

Top 10 – Dance Hits
Each contestant had to sing a Dance song. The guest performer for this episode was Despina Vandi.

Top 9 – Movie Hits
Each contestant had to sing a movie hit song. The guest performer for this episode was Elli Kokkinou.

Top 8 – Today's Hits
Each contestant had to sing a current hit song. The guest performers for this episode were Nikos Oikonomopoulos and Vegas.

Top 7 – My Idol
Each singer had to sing a song by their music idol. The guest performer for this episode was Tamta.

Top 6 – Rock Hits
Each contestant had to sing one rock song in English and the other in Greek.

Top 5 – Summer Hits 2010/Dedications
Each contestant had to sing one current summer hit first, then a dedicated song to a loved one second.

Top 4 – Jury's Choice
Each contestant had to sing two songs selected by the jury for them, with the second song performed using a live band. The guest performers for this episode were Giorgos Alkaios & Friends and Sunrise Avenue.

Top 3 – 80's, 90's & 00's
Each contestant had to sing one song from the 1980s, 1990s, and 2000s. The guest performer for this episode was Elena Paparizou.

Top 2 – Finale

Elimination chart 

1Bottom candidates were the last ones to hear their verdict. It was never officially announced if they were amongst contestants with the fewest votes.
2Christos Tsakiris decided to quit the show after learning that he would be forced to sing an English song the next week. This came after increased tensions between Tsakiris and the judges after a performance of an English song the week prior, where he sang "Na-na-na" in place of the actual lyrics.
3Nikos Tasiopoulos was brought in by Alpha TV to replace Chistos Tsakiris after his withdrawal. Tasiopoulos had not previously made it to the top 15.

References

External links
 Official website

Season 01
2010 Greek television seasons